Scheepvaartkwartier (Maritime Quarter) is a neighborhood of Rotterdam, Netherlands.

Neighbourhoods of Rotterdam